This was the tenth European Championship and was won for the fifth time by England on Points Average. This tournament saw the introduction of the Other Nationalities team, which was made up of players from Scotland and the southern hemisphere who played in the NRFU. The tournament also reverted to the single game round robin format.

Results

Final standings

References

European Nations Cup
European rugby league championship
European rugby league championship
International rugby league competitions hosted by the United Kingdom
International rugby league competitions hosted by France
1949 in English rugby league
1950 in English rugby league
1949 in French sport
1950 in French sport
1949 in Welsh sport
1950 in Welsh sport